José Ramón Maldonado Alonso (born 25 April 1988, in Nogales, Sonora) is a Mexican former footballer who last played for Alebrijes de Oaxaca. He also played for Chapulineros de Oaxaca in the Liga de Balompié Mexicano.

References

External links
 

1988 births
Living people
Association football forwards
Alebrijes de Oaxaca players
Lobos BUAP footballers
Unión de Curtidores footballers
Potros UAEM footballers
Ascenso MX players
Liga Premier de México players
Liga de Balompié Mexicano players
Footballers from Sonora
People from Nogales, Sonora
Mexican footballers